The Royal Gunpowder Mills are a former industrial site in Waltham Abbey, England.
It was one of three Royal Gunpowder Mills in the United Kingdom (the others being at Ballincollig and Faversham). Waltham Abbey is the only site to have survived virtually intact.

The Royal Gunpowder Mills, Waltham Abbey, were in operation for over 300 years. Starting in the mid-1850s the site became involved in the development of revolutionary nitro-based explosives and propellants known as "smokeless powder". The site grew in size, and black powder became less important.

Shortly after the Second World War it became solely a Defence Research Establishment – firstly the Explosives Research and Development Establishment, then the Propellants, Explosives and Rocket Motor Establishment Waltham Abbey; and finally the Royal Armament Research and Development Establishment Waltham Abbey.

Pre-gunpowder use of the site 

The story of gunpowder production at Waltham Abbey begins with a fulling mill for cloth production; originally set up by the monks of the Abbey on the Millhead Stream, an engineered water course tapping the waters of the River Lea. Mills were adaptable and in the early 17th century it was converted to an 'Oyle Mill', i.e. for producing vegetable oils. In the Second Dutch War gunpowder supply shortages were encountered and the oil mill was converted to gunpowder production, possibly in response to this. In 1665 it was acquired by Ralph Hudson using saltpetre made in Bedfordshire and Hertfordshire.

The Hudson family sold out to William Walton at the end of the 17th century, starting a family connection lasting almost a hundred years. The enterprise was successful under the Walton's tenure, especially thanks to the efforts of William's widow, Philippa Walton, and the Mills expanded up the Millhead Stream as additional production facilities were added; the material progressing from one building to another as it passed through the various processes. The Waltham Abbey Mills were one of the first examples in the 18th century of an industrialised factory system, not often recognised. In 1735 they were described by Thomas Fuller, a local historian, as "the largest and compleatest works in Great Britain."

Purchase of the site by the Crown
In the 1780s there was fresh concern over security, quality and economy of supply. The deputy comptroller of the Royal Laboratory at Woolwich, Major, later Lieutenant General, Sir William Congreve advocated that the Waltham Abbey Mills should be purchased by the Crown to ensure secure supplies and to establish what would now be called a centre of excellence for development of manufacturing processes and to establish quality and cost standards by which private contractors could be judged. In October 1787 the Crown purchased the mills from John Walton for £10,000, starting a 204-year ownership. Congreve was a man of immense drive and vision, a pioneer of careful management, quality control and the application of the scientific method. Under his regime manufacture moved from what had been a black art to, in the context of its day, an advanced technology.
The distinguished engineer John Rennie coined the phrase ‘The Old Establishment’ in his 1806 report on the Royal Gun Powder Factory. The term refers to the gunpowder mills when they were still privately owned, before they were acquired by The Crown in 1787.

Reflecting this, the mills were able to respond successfully in volume and quality to the massive increases in demand which arose over the period of the French Revolution and Napoleonic Wars from 1789, culminating in the victory at Waterloo in 1815. In the years following Waterloo the Mills entered a period of quiet with a steep decline in staff numbers and production levels. However, there was a steady advance in machinery and process development.

The quiet was not to last. Conflict broke out in 1854 with the Crimean War with Russia, followed by the Indian Mutiny and a succession of colonial conflicts followed, culminating in the Boer War of 1899 - 1902.

All of this provided the impulse for further development. Whilst the mills' function was to provide gunpowder for military use, either as a propellant for use in guns, or as a military explosive for demolition, etc., improvements effected there were a strong influence on private industry producing for civil activity - construction, mining, quarrying, tunnelling, railway building etc. which created a massive demand for gunpowder in the 19th century.

First World War
The First World War from 1914 to 1918 brought a huge upsurge in demand. The East Flank, including a long range of Cordite incorporating mills, designed by Harry Bell Measures, was built at this time. Staff numbers increased by around 3,000 to a total of 6,230. The 3,000 additional workers were largely female, recruited from the surrounding area, and this was a significant social phenomenon.

After World War I there was another period of quiet before anxieties about the future surfaced again. It was decided that production at Waltham Abbey would be gradually transferred to the west of the country, more distant and thus safer from air attack from Europe. However, in the meantime, production continued and crucial development work was carried out on TNT production and on the new explosive RDX.

Second World War
During Second World War, Waltham Abbey remained an important cordite production unit and for the first two years of the war was the sole producer of RDX. RDX is one component of torpex, the explosive that was used in the Bouncing Bomb.

Total transfer of RDX production to the west of England, to ROF Bridgwater; and dispersal of cordite production to new propellant factories located: in the west of Scotland, three co-located factories at ROF Bishopton, to Wales, ROF Wrexham, and to the North East, ROF Ranskill.

The Royal Gunpowder Mills finally closed on 28 July 1945.

Post World War use of the site
In 1945 the establishment re-opened as a research centre known as The Explosives Research and Development Establishment, or ERDE.

In 1977 it became the Propellants, Explosives and Rocket Motor Establishment, Waltham Abbey, or PERME Waltham Abbey. As a research centre Waltham Abbey was responsible for military propellant and high explosives and expanded into the increasingly significant field of rocket propellants, solid and liquid and a range of specialised applications, e.g. 'snifters' for altering space vehicles direction when in flight, cartridges for firing aircraft ejector seats, engine and generator starter cartridges - these applications have been called 'a measured strong shove'. The rocket activity later extended to the production of rocket motors, including work on the Skylark project.

In 1984 the South site and the Lower Island works were handed over to Royal Ordnance Plc immediately before it was privatised. 

The North side however remained in Ministry of Defence control as a research centre; becoming part of the Royal Armament Research and Development Establishment. After various reorganisations, the research centre finally closed in 1991.

Sale of the North site by the Ministry of Defence

Heritage site
A large area of the north site is listed as the Waltham Abbey SSSI and another separate area is a scheduled ancient monument.  Visitors can see exhibits related to gunpowder making, tour the site on a land train An attempt to demolish the cordite mills and replace them with dormitories for young people staying at a children's activity centre was rejected by Epping Forest District Council in 2016 after exposure in the national press.

Narrow-gauge railway
It is sometimes known as the Hidden Railway.

Sale of the South site by Royal Ordnance
After the South site, also known as Quinton Hill, was vacated and also decontaminated and redeveloped, much of the remaining land was converted into the  Gunpowder Park, which is part of the Lee Valley Park and was opened in 2004. The regenerated parkland is dedicated to the arts, science and wildlife.

Waltham Abbey Royal Gunpowder Mills in popular culture
The War of the Worlds by H.G. Wells Book 1 Chapter 17 ‘The Thunder Child’ Here there were rumours of Martians at Epping, and news of the destruction of Waltham Abbey Powdermills in a vain attempt to blow up one of the invaders.
 The mill also appears in Michael Ondaatje's 2018 novel Warlight: Shortly after the end of World War II the protagonist Nathaniel Williams helps his mentor, 'The Darter', transporting illegal greyhounds and, later, boxed cargo inland through the canal network from the River Thames, including the Gunpowder Mills canal system.
 On 3 May 2020 the mills were featured in an episode of the BBCs Countryfile programme.
Author and naturalist Helen Macdonald visited the site in the BBC4 programme The Hidden Wilds of the Motorway broadcast on 30 June 2020.

Digital archive 
After the closure of ERDE, the inherited archive material passed through a number of hands and storage locations, particularly in the latter period before opening to the public, when outside staff from the firm designing the exhibition had to have free access. Consequently by 2001 the archive had become rather disorganised. The opportunity has therefore been taken to start a ground-up exercise involving a complete check of the holding and the design of computer databases of the material in order to produce the digital catalogue.
 Our archive has been digitised and is available to view online at www.wargm.org.
 Funding for the online archive was donated by the Royal Gunpowder Mills Friends Association.
 The archive is also listed on The National Archives website.

See also
 Ballincollig Royal Gunpowder Mills
 Cordite
 Faversham explosives industry
 Gunpowder
 Gunpowder magazines in England
 TNT
 RDX
 J. E. Gordon

References 
Notes

Sources
 Cocroft, Wayne D. (2000). Dangerous Energy: The archaeology of Gunpowder and military explosives manufacture. Swindon: English Heritage. .
 Elliott, Bryn (1996). "The Royal Gunpowder Factory Explosions 1940". In: After the Battle, 93, pp 34 – 49. .
 Elliott, Bryn (1998). "Royal Gunpowder Factory Sequel". In: After the Battle, 101, pp 49 – 51. .
 
 (N/A), (1993). The Royal Gunpowder Factory, Waltham Abbey, Essex: An RCHME Survey, 1993. London: Royal Commission on the Historical Monuments of England. 
 Sinclair, Iain (2002). London Orbital, pp105–107

External links 

 Royal Gunpowder Mills
 Royal Gunpowder Mills Archive
 Royal Gunpowder Mills Books
 Royal Gunpowder Mills The Armoury
 A history of the Gunpowder Mills watercourses
 Geograph images

Waltham Abbey
Cordite
Military research establishments of the United Kingdom
Gunpowder mills
European Route of Industrial Heritage Anchor Points
Buildings and structures in Essex
Heritage railways in Essex
Military establishments in Essex
Museums in Essex
Science museums in England
Military and war museums in England
History museums in Essex
Transport museums in England
River Lea
Lee Valley Park
Grade I listed buildings in Essex
Grade II* listed buildings in Essex
Royal Ordnance Factories in England
Grade I listed industrial buildings
Grade II* listed industrial buildings
1945 disestablishments in England
Waltham Abbey